Neil McArthur  (born 1956/1957) is a British businessman, the founder of Opal Telecom, former MD of TalkTalk Technology, and now head of group innovation for TalkTalk.

Early life
McArthur was born and grew up in Carr Road, Irlam, the son of a steel worker at the former Irlam Steel Works, and a librarian.

McArthur earned a degree in engineering from the University of Essex. He is a fellow of the Institutes of Engineering and Technology and a fellow of the Institute of Mechanical Engineers.

Honours and Appointments
In 1992, he was awarded an MBE for his services to engineering. He received an honorary doctorate from the University of Essex.

McArthur is a member of the advisory board of the University of Essex Business School, chairman and a trustee of the Hamilton Davies Trust charity and chairman of the Manchester Tech Trust. He is also a member of the University of Manchester's board of governors.

Personal life
He is married to Anne, and lives in Glazebrook, Cheshire.

References

Living people
1950s births
British company founders
Alumni of the University of Essex
TalkTalk Group people
People from Salford